Pistols at Dawn is the second full-length album by the English punk rock band, Consumed. It was their first for Golf Records and was distributed by BYO Records after having recorded two releases on Fat Wreck Chords, but the band split up shortly afterwards. The album contains excerpts from the movies Army of Darkness, Darkman and Love and Death.

Zero Magazine reviewer Che Brooks said "Pistols at Dawn is a rabid romp through melody and good cheer".

Track listing 
All tracks written by Consumed
"Not Today" – 2:56 
"Ready to Strike" – 3:25
"Gutbuster" – 2:20
"Take it on the Chin" – 2:11 
"Home Again" – 2:38
"Glory Hole" – 3:44
"Same Way Twice" – 2:47
"Gentle Persuasion" – 2:09
"Odd Man Out" – 3:00
"Out on Your Own" – 2:50
"Hello Sailor" – 2:40
"A.O.T." – 3:53
hidden track – 3:15

Credits 
 Steve Ford – guitar, vocals
 Will Burchell – guitar
 Wes Wasley – bass guitar, vocals
 Chris Billam – drums
 Produced and engineered by Andy Sneap

References

External links 
 BYO Records band and album page
 Aversion review
 Zero magazine article (working archived copy)

Consumed (band) albums
2002 albums
Albums produced by Andy Sneap
BYO Records albums